Garfunkel is the second compilation album by Art Garfunkel, released in 1988. The album features some of Garfunkel's hit songs. The album also contains the 1974 non-album single A-Side "Second Avenue". The album failed to chart.

Track listing
 "When a Man Loves a Woman" (Calvin Lewis, Andrew Wright) - 4:30
 "Break Away" (Benny Gallagher, Graham Lyle) –3:31
 "Bright Eyes" (Mike Batt) –3:55
 "(What a) Wonderful World" (Herb Alpert, Sam Cooke, Lou Adler) - 3:29
 "All I Know" (Jimmy Webb) –3:48
 "Scissors Cut" (Webb) –3:52
 "I Only Have Eyes for You" (Al Dubin, Harry Warren) –3:40
 "So Much in Love" (George Williams, Bill Jackson, Roy Straigis) - 2:24
 "99 Miles from L.A." (Albert Hammond, Hal David) –3:28
 "Second Avenue" (Tim Moore) - 2:46
 "A Heart in New York" (Gallagher, Lyle) –3:10
 "I Have a Love" (Stephen Sondheim, Leonard Bernstein) - 4:29

References

Art Garfunkel albums
Albums produced by Richard Perry
Albums produced by Roy Halee
1988 compilation albums
CBS Records compilation albums
Albums produced by Art Garfunkel